Giedrius Matulevičius (born 5 March 1997) is a Lithuanian footballer who plays as a midfielder for Sūduva and the Lithuania national team.

International career
Matulevičius made his international debut for Lithuania on 20 November 2018, coming on as a substitute in the 69th minute for Modestas Vorobjovas in the 2018–19 UEFA Nations League C match against Serbia, which finished as a 1–4 away loss.

Career statistics

International

References

External links
 
 
 
 

1997 births
Living people
Sportspeople from Marijampolė
Lithuanian footballers
Lithuania youth international footballers
Lithuania under-21 international footballers
Lithuania international footballers
Lithuanian expatriate footballers
Lithuanian expatriate sportspeople in Italy
Expatriate footballers in Italy
Association football midfielders
FK Sūduva Marijampolė players
Parma Calcio 1913 players
S.S. Arezzo players
U.C. Sampdoria players
A Lyga players